Fallen Never Forgotten: Vietnam Memorials in the USA is a large sized hardcover book that covers more than 50 Vietnam Memorials in the United States of America. The book was written by a Vietnam Veteran named Ronny Ymbras and his oldest son Matthew Ymbras.

Motivation for the book came from Ronny's time in Vietnam and a friendly fire incident that occurred on March 26, 1968 which left 13 of his platoon dead and 26 wounded. After the incident Ronny always vowed to honor his fallen brothers by visiting their families to tell them what great soldiers they were. As the years passed that goal became more and more unattainable.

So Ronny decided to honor those from his platoon and all of the american service members who never made it home from Vietnam in a different way, by publishing a book that is a tribute to the fallen.

Ronny says that "Many Vietnam Veterans wish they could visit the many Vietnam Veteran Memorials around the country but cannot make the trip due to time, distance. money or health. With this book I tried to bring the memorials to them so they can visually visit these sacred sites that memorialize their friends, family members or brothers in arms."

After being published in 2016 Fallen Never Forgotten: Vietnam Memorials in the USA has quickly been considered the best book on the subject and one of the more popular Vietnam Veteran gifts.

References

External links
 Official Website

Vietnam War books
2016 non-fiction books